Tamás Waliczky (born in 1959, in Budapest, Hungary), is a Hungarian artist and animator, known for his new media art.

Biography 
Tamás Waliczky started out by creating cartoon films (1968–1983), whilst working as a painter, illustrator and photographer. He began working with computers in 1983. He was artist-in-residence at the Zentrum für Kunst und Medientechnologie (ZKM) in 1992, and subsequently a member of the Institute's research staff (1993–1997). Later taking up a guest professorship at the Hochschule der Bildenden Künste Saar (HBK Saar) in Saarbrücken (1997–2002).

Institute of Advanced Media Arts and Sciences (IAMAS) in Gifu, Japan, chose Waliczky as artist-in-residence for 1998 to 1999.

From 2003 until 2005 he was professor at Institut für Mediengestaltung (IMG), Fachhochschule Mainz. From 2005 to 2010 he was at HBK Saar, this time as a full-time professor. As of 2010, he is a professor at the School of Creative Media at the City University of Hong Kong.

His works have won numerous international awards, including the 1989 Golden Nica at the Prix Ars Electronica, Linz, and has been shown in several exhibitions worldwide, including the Lyon Biennale, the ICC Gallery Tokyo, and the Multimediale Karlsruhe. His works are currently in several public collections, including the Centre Georges Pompidou, Paris or the Ludwig Museum, Budapest.

Tamas Waliczky has been selected to represent Hungary at the 58th Venice Biennale, in 2019.

Notable work
This is a select list of notable work by Waliczky, in order by date completed.
Imaginary Cameras (computer graphic series and computer animations), 2016–2019
Reflections (video installation), 2014
Micromovements in Snapshots (video installation), 2014
Wheels (installation with real-time simulation), 2013
Homes (interactive installation), 2012, 2015
Adventures of Tom Tomiczky (computer animation), 2011
Marionettes (computer animation, video installation), 2007
The fisherman and his wife (computer animation), 2000
Focus (interactive installation), 1998
Sculptures (video installation), 1997
Landscape (computer animation, video installation), 1996
The way (computer animation, video installation), 1994
The Forest (computer animation, video installation, interactive installation), 1993
The Garden, 21st Century Amateur Film (computer animation, video installation), 1992
Conversation (with Tibor Szemzo, audio-visual performance), 1990
Memory of Moholy-Nagy (with John Halas, computer animation), 1990
Is there any room for me here? (computer animation), 1988
Pictures (computer animation), 1988

Public collections

Centre Pompidou, Musee National D'Art Moderne, Paris, France
Museum Ludwig, Budapest, Hungary
ZKM, Karlsruhe, Deutschland
Tokyo Photographic Art Museum, Tokyo, Japan

References

Anna Szepesi: “The Imaginary Cameras of Tamas Waliczky”, Photography is Art Magazine, 2018, Issue 07, Hong Kong, p. 98-106.
Lev Manovich: Cinema as Cultural Interface (1997), International Journal of Transmedia Literacy (IJTL). 1.1 December 2015, Edited by Ciastellardi Matteo,Di Rosario Giovanna, p. 244
Steve Fore: "Waliczky in Wonderland", Animation Studies Online Journal, 16 May 2014 (https://journal.animationstudies.org/steve-fore-waliczky-in-wonderland/)
Chesna Ng: "Computer animation master Tamás Waliczky and his exhibition Dance with the interval", Milk magazine, 2013 March, Hong Kong
Fu Ningning: "GOD'S EYES / TAMAS WALICZKY'S COSMOLOGY", World Art magazine, 2008 Nov. No. 77, Beijing
"WALICZKY, SELECTED WORKS 1986-2003", catalog with essays of Győrgy Palos, Jozsef Melyi, Jeffrey Shaw, Itsuo Sakane and Nikolett Eross, Budapest, 2005
Mark B. N. Hansen: "New philosophy for new media", The MIT Press, Cambridge, Massachusetts; London, England, 2004
Sven Drühl: "TAMÁS WALICZKY - DER ZEITKÜNSTLER", Kunstforum International, Bd. 151, Ruppichteroth, 2000
Lev Manovich: "CINEMA AS CULTURAL INTERFACE", MIT Press, 2001
Toshino Iguchi: "THE 20th CENTURY 100 ART MATRIX", BT Monthly Art Magazine, Tokyo, 2000
Lev Manovich: "THE CAMERA AND THE WORLD; NEW WORKS BY TAMÁS WALICZKY", Continental Drift, Prestel, Munich - New York, 1998
Anne-Marie Duguet: "TAMÁS WALICZKY" catalog, NTT/ICC Gallery, Tokyo, 1996
Masato Shirai: "A MECHANISM FOR REORGANIZING THE WORLD" catalog, NTT/ICC Gallery, Tokyo, 1996
Pier Luigi Capucci: "L'AFFETTIVITA DELLO SPAZIO" Domus magazine, October 1996, Milano
Anna Szepesi: "DER WALD / THE FOREST" artintact 2, ZKM/Institut für Bildmedien, Cantz Verlag, Ostfildern, 1995
Takis Kyriakoulakos: "TAMÁS WALICZKY: LE POETE DEL'INTIME" TECH IMAGES, Paris, 1990
Shalom Gorewitz: "PROPHET WITHOUT HONOR (COMPUTER VIDEO ARTIST TAMÁS WALICZKY)" THE INDEPENDENT, New York, 1990
Maria Grazia Mattei: "L'EST ELETTRONICO", ZOOM, Milano, 1980

1959 births
Hungarian artists
New media artists
Hungarian contemporary artists
Living people
Academic staff of the Hochschule der Bildenden Künste Saar
Academic staff of the City University of Hong Kong